"Y.M.C.A." is a song by American disco group Village People. It was released in 1978 as the only single from their third studio album, Cruisin' (1978). The song was written by Jacques Morali (also the record's producer) and singer Victor Willis. A medley with "Hot Cop" reached No. 2 on Billboard Dance Music/Club Play Singles chart, while the song reached No. 2 on the Billboard Hot 100 charts in early 1979, placing behind both "Le Freak" by Chic and "Da Ya Think I'm Sexy?" by Rod Stewart. Outside the US, "Y.M.C.A." reached No. 1 in the UK around the same time, becoming the group's biggest hit. It has sold 12 million copies worldwide.

The song remains popular and is played at many sporting events in the US and Europe, with crowds joining in on the dance in which arm movements are used to spell out the four letters of the song's title. In September 2000 "Y.M.C.A." was used as the Space Shuttle wake-up call on day 11 of STS-106. In 2009, "Y.M.C.A." set a Guinness World Record when over 44,000 people danced to Village People's live performance of the song at the 2008 Sun Bowl game in El Paso, Texas.

"Y.M.C.A." is No. 7 on VH1's list of The 100 Greatest Dance Songs of the 20th Century. In 2020, "Y.M.C.A" was inducted into the Grammy Hall of Fame and selected by the Library of Congress for preservation in the National Recording Registry for being "culturally, historically, or aesthetically significant". In its official press release, the Library noted that "back in its heyday, 'Y.M.C.A.' was a hit around the world, going to No. 1 on the charts in over 15 countries, and its ongoing popularity is evidence that, despite the naysayers, disco has never truly died."

History
In the US, the YMCA began building single room occupancy (SRO) facilities in the 1880s to house people from rural areas who moved into cities to look for work. By the 1970s, the typical YMCA tenants were more likely to be homeless people and youth facing life issues, rather than people migrating from rural areas.

Victor Willis, lead singer and lyricist, recalls that while in the studio, producer Jacques Morali asked him, "What exactly is the YMCA?" After Willis explained it to him, he saw the expression on Morali's face and said, "Don't tell me, Jacques, you want to write a song about it?" and they quickly wrote the track for the album Cruisin'.  Upon the song's release, YMCA threatened to sue the band over trademark infringement. The organization ultimately settled with the composers out of court and later expressed pride regarding the song saluting the organization.

In 2015, Willis won a legal case against Can't Stop Productions, successfully claiming that he and Morali had written this and other Village People songs together, without any involvement from executive producer Henri Belolo, who was credited on the song's original release.  The production company claimed that Belolo had written French lyrics that were then adapted by Willis, but this claim was rejected by the court which ruled that Belolo's name as co-writer should be removed.

Composition and background

Lyrical content
Taken at face value, the song's lyrics extol the virtues of the Young Men's Christian Association (YMCA). However, in the gay culture from which the image and music of the Village People came, the song was implicitly understood as celebrating YMCA's reputation as a popular cruising and hookup spot, particularly for the younger men to whom it was addressed. The initial goal of Village People producers Morali and Belolo was to attract disco's gay audience by featuring popular gay fantasy in their music. Although co-creator Morali was gay and the group was initially intended to target gay men, the group became more popular and more mainstream over time.

Conversely, Willis had said that he wrote the song in Vancouver, British Columbia and, through his publicist, that he did not write "Y.M.C.A." as a gay anthem, but rather as a reflection of the fun activities that young urban black youth experienced at YMCA, such as basketball and swimming. However, Willis has often acknowledged his fondness for double entendre.

In an article for Gothamist, writer Abbey White states the atmosphere of YMCA was "more complicated than the lyrics portray, with gay culture and working-class workouts coexisting in a single communal space", creating "a mix of white-collar and blue-collar residents, along with retired seniors and veterans", with about half of the residents being gay. While the song gives the impression that YMCA SROs in the 1970s had a party atmosphere, Paul Groth states that YMCA SRO units actually had "more supervision of your social life — a kind of management as to how you behaved...[than] in a commercial rooming house, which mostly wanted to make sure the rooms were rented", without monitoring who you brought to your room.

Song structure
The song, played in the key of G♭ major, begins with 8 bars of a Db suspended chord over a bare disco drum beat. This is followed by a brass riff, backed by the constant pulse that typified disco. Many different instruments are used throughout for an overall orchestral feel, another disco convention, but it is brass that stands out.

As with other Village People hits, the lead vocals are handled by Willis and the background vocals are supplied by Willis and professional background singers. The distinctive vocal line features the repeated "Young man!" ecphonesis, followed by Willis singing the verse lines. The background vocals join in throughout the song.

Willis' version of the song is used in the Village People film Can't Stop the Music, though by that time Ray Simpson had replaced him as the policeman.

Reception
Billboard stated that "Y.M.C.A." is "another example of [the Village People's] droll humor, playing off its gayness with hard hat themes."  Billboard also called "Y.M.C.A." (and its B-side, "The Women") one of the best cuts on the Cruisin album.  Cash Box said that "Y.M.C.A." has "layered horn work and strings and a bright, soaring chorus" and that "Willis' lead vocals are commanding."  Record World said that it "has the same foot-stomping bass line and tongue-in-cheek lyrics" as previous Village People hit "Macho Man" and that "the vocals are strong and the production thunderous."

Although the song did not reach No. 1 in the United States, it became a No. 1 hit throughout the world and has remained popular at parties, sporting events, weddings and functions ever since.

Music video
The music video for "Y.M.C.A." was filmed in New York City in July 1978. The video features the band singing the song and dancing all over the city. The location shown the most is the original site of YMCA, McBurney, 213 West 23rd Street. Other filming locations included 395 West Street, the West Side Piers and Hudson River Park. It ends with the camera zooming in on the Empire State Building.

Origin of dance and hand movement

YMCA is also the name of a group dance with cheerleader Y-M-C-A choreography invented to fit the song. One of the phases involves moving arms to form the letters Y-M-C-A as they are sung in the chorus:

Y  arms outstretched and raised upwards
M  made by bending the elbows from the 'Y' pose so the fingertips meet in front of the chest
C  arms extended to the left
A  hands held together above head

The dance originated on Dick Clark's American Bandstand. The group performed the song during the January 6, 1979 episode. Clark then said to Willis that he would like to show him something, playing the song again with the audience doing YMCA hand gestures. Willis immediately picked up on the dance and mimicked the hand movements back at the audience as other Village People members stared at him with puzzled looks. Clark then turned to Willis and said, "Victor, think you can work this dance into your routine?"  Willis responded, "I think we're gonna have to." In a 2008 retrospective article for Spin, Randy Jones has opined that the dance may have originated as a misunderstanding: the group's original choreographed dance had the group clapping above their heads during the chorus and he believes that the audience, believing them to be making the letter "Y", began following suit.

Following the sixth inning of New York Yankees baseball games at Yankee Stadium, the grounds crew traditionally grooms the infield while leading the crowd in the dance.

Impact and legacy
VH1 placed "Y.M.C.A." at #7 on their list of 100 Greatest Dance Songs in 2000, while Paste Magazine ranked the song #1 on their list of The 60 Best Dancefloor Classics in February 2017. In 2022, Rolling Stone ranked it #139 in their list of 200 Greatest Dance Songs of All Time.

The Village People recorded a version of the song for Pepsi in 1997 for a commercial featuring a group of dancing bears, changing the lyrics to match the drink and spelling out P-E-P-S-I. A few months afterwards, Pepsi used the song again as part of its new blue-themed imaging for the Pepsi Globe.

During the 2008 Sun Bowl in El Paso, Texas, in a half time performance with The Village People, it became the largest Y.M.C.A dance ever, with over 40,000 people in attendance dancing and singing to the song.

In 2012, in a landmark ruling in accordance with the Copyright Act of 1976, Willis terminated his copyrights granted to the publishers Can't Stop Productions and Scorpio Music.
In March 2015, it was determined that the sole writers of the song were Morali and Willis.

In March 2020, the US Library of Congress added the song to its National Recording Registry, which preserves for posterity audio that is "culturally, historically or aesthetically significant".  In December 2020, "Y.M.C.A." was inducted into the Grammy Hall of Fame.

President Donald Trump began using the song (as well as another Village People song, "Macho Man") to close out his rallies during his 2020 re-election campaign.  Willis initially approved its use but after several incidents involving the Black Lives Matter protests, he demanded Trump stop. Saturday Night Live parodied the song and the group's reaction with "Cease and desist" on the October 24, 2020, segment of Weekend Update. As a result, the song was back in the Top 20 on iTunes in November 2020 and hit the #2 spot on the Billboard Dance Digital Song Sales chart.  On November 6, following the media's declaration that Joe Biden had taken the lead in Pennsylvania over then President Trump in the 2020 US presidential election, Biden supporters celebrated by dancing in the streets and singing the song across the city of Philadelphia. The song was played over loudspeakers as Donald Trump boarded Air Force One for the last time on January 20, 2021, en route to Florida before the inauguration of Joe Biden.

Charts

Weekly charts

Year-end charts

All-time charts

Certifications and sales

Hideki Saijo version

In 1979, Japanese singer Hideki Saijo covered the song for his compilation album Young Man/Hideki Flying Up as "Young Man (Y.M.C.A.)". In Japan, the cover topped on the Oricon chart for five consecutive weeks and became the seventh best-selling single of 1979 in Japan. For the cover, the lyrics were re-written in Japanese by Saijo's manager, Ryuji Amagai. This version is also notable for having a call-and-response in the middle where Saijo and a group of child singers chant the letters "Y M C A" back and forth.

Commercial performance
"Young Man (Y.M.C.A.)" debuted at number two on the Oricon Weekly Singles Chart, and in the following week, it reached number one, where it stayed for five consecutive weeks. The song finally became the seventh best-selling single of 1979 in Japan and Saijo's best-selling single to date, with the sales of 808,000 copies.

Following the death of Saijo on 16 May 2018, the song re-entered the chart, peaking at number fifteen on the Billboard Japan Hot 100.

Accolades
"Young Man (Y.M.C.A.)" won the Grand Prix at the FNS Music Festival '79 and the 10th Japan Music Awards. Despite the hit, the song was disqualified for the 21st Japan Record Awards due to the competition's guideline that requires the songs to be original work. At the award, Saijo instead won the golden award for his single, "Yuki ga Areba" (1979).

Cover versions
"Young Man (Y.M.C.A.)" has been covered by multiple other Asian musicians, including Keisuke Kuwata, Aska, George Lam, Yang Kun, and E-girls.

Track listing
7-inch single
 "Young Man (Y.M.C.A.)" – 4:43
 "Hideki Disco Special" (Medley)

Charts

Weekly charts

Year-end charts

Touché version

In 1998, Touché covered the hit for their album Kids in America with Krayzee. In this version Touche take over the vocal parts and only the rap contributes to Krayzee. In Belgium, this cover version was a top ten hit, while the success in the German-speaking countries, however, was rather modest.

Music video
In the music video Touche and Krayzee perform the song in a city area, accompanied by elaborate effects.

Track listing
CD maxi

 "YMCA" (Rap Version) – 3:09
 "YMCA" (Vocal Version) – 3:14
 "Promise To Believe" (Touché) – 3:57
 "I Want Your Body" (Touché) – 3:19

Charts

References

External links

1978 singles
1978 songs
1979 singles
1998 singles
Bertelsmann Music Group singles
Casablanca Records singles
Christianity in popular culture
Disco songs
Donald Trump 2020 presidential campaign
European Hot 100 Singles number-one singles
Hansa Records singles
LGBT-related songs
Number-one singles in Australia
Number-one singles in Austria
Number-one singles in Germany
Number-one singles in New Zealand
Number-one singles in Italy
Number-one singles in Sweden
Number-one singles in Switzerland
Oricon Weekly number-one singles
RCA Records singles
RPM Top Singles number-one singles
Song recordings produced by Jacques Morali
Songs written by Jacques Morali
Songs written by Victor Willis
Sony Music Entertainment Japan singles
UK Singles Chart number-one singles
United States National Recording Registry recordings
Village People songs
Song
Memes